Strange Voyage is a 1946 American film directed by Irving Allen.

Plot
A man goes looking for treasure.

Cast
Eddie Albert as Chris Thompson
Forrest Taylor as Skipper
Ray Teal as Captain Andrews
Matt Willis as Hammer
Martin Garralaga as Manuel
Elena Verdugo as Carmelita Lopez
Bobby Cooper as Jimmy Trask
Clyde Fillmore as Sportsman
Daniel Kerry as Ben
Henry Orosco as Father
Junior, the monkey

Production
It was the first produced script by Edward and Edna Anhalt who had been writing and selling stories to movies as "Andrew Holt".

References

External links
Strange Voyage at IMDb
Strange Voyage at TCMDB
Strange Voyage at BFI

1946 films
Monogram Pictures films
Films directed by Irving Allen
American black-and-white films
American adventure drama films
1940s adventure drama films
Films with screenplays by Edward Anhalt
1946 drama films
1940s English-language films
1940s American films